Muhammad Yaghoub (born 10 January 1947) is a Pakistani wrestler. He competed in the men's freestyle 74 kg at the 1972 Summer Olympics.

References

External links
 

1947 births
Living people
Pakistani male sport wrestlers
Olympic wrestlers of Pakistan
Wrestlers at the 1972 Summer Olympics
Place of birth missing (living people)
Wrestlers at the 1974 Asian Games
Asian Games competitors for Pakistan
Commonwealth Games medallists in wrestling
Commonwealth Games silver medallists for Pakistan
Wrestlers at the 1970 British Commonwealth Games
20th-century Pakistani people
Medallists at the 1970 British Commonwealth Games